The 2007 BMW PGA Championship was the 53rd edition of the BMW PGA Championship, an annual professional golf tournament on the European Tour. It was held 24–27 May at the West Course of Wentworth Club in Virginia Water, Surrey, England, a suburb southwest of London.

Anders Hansen defeated Justin Rose in a playoff to capture his second BMW PGA Championship.

Course layout

Past champions in the field 
Seven former champions entered the tournament.

Made the cut

Missed the cut

Nationalities in the field

Round summaries

First round 
Thursday, 24 May 2007

Second round 
Friday, 25 May 2007

Third round 
Saturday, 26 May 2007

Final round 
Sunday, 27 May 2007

Scorecard

Cumulative tournament scores, relative to par

Source:

Playoff 
The playoff began on the par five 18th; Hansen holed a 25-foot (7.6m) putt for birdie which could not be replicated by Rose as his effort slid past the hole to leave the Dane celebrating his second victory in The European Tour's flagship event.

References 

BMW PGA Championship
Golf tournaments in England
BMW PGA Championship
BMW PGA Championship
BMW PGA Championship